The Color of Fame is a 2008 Venezuelan drama film about a Marilyn Monroe poser and a transsexual who believes to be her reincarnation. The film was Venezuela's official submission for the 81st Annual Academy Awards for Best Foreign Language Film.

Plot
Magaly (Elaiza Gil) enters a television contest looking for a Marilyn Monroe lookalike for a $25,000 prize. Her husband, Arturo (Alberto Arifa), believes is the best way to get through the financial crisis they are facing. As the challenge goes by, Magaly partners with Héctor (Miguel Ferrari) who believes to be the Monroe's reincarnation in a "third world transsexual man". She begins to lose her identity and follows the same downfall of the late actress.

References

External links
 
 

2008 drama films
2008 LGBT-related films
2008 films
2000s Spanish-language films
Transgender-related films
Venezuelan LGBT-related films
LGBT-related drama films